Manakuppam is one of the villages under Sathamangalam revenue village in the Indian state of Puducherry. It is an isolated part of Villianur Commune and Villianur Taluk.

Geography
Manakuppam is surrounded by Tamil Nadu, bordered by Nallathur (East and North),  Nadukuppam (west) and the dried Malattaru river in the south.

Transport
Manakuppam is located 18 km from Pondicherry city. Manakuppam can be reached by bus running between Pondicherry and Madukarai.

Road Network
Manakuppam is connected to Pondicherry by Mangalam - Maducarai State Highway (RC-19)

Politics
Manakuppam is a part of Mangalam Assembly Constituency which comes under Puducherry (Lok Sabha constituency).

External links
 Official website of the Government of the Union Territory of Puducherry

Villages in Puducherry district